The 2018–19 C.F. Monterrey season was the 83rd season in the football club's history and the 68th consecutive season in the top flight of Mexican football. In addition to the Liga MX and Copa MX, the club also competed in the CONCACAF Champions League.

Coaching staff

Players

Squad information

Players and squad numbers last updated on 3 December 2018.Note: Flags indicate national team as has been defined under FIFA eligibility rules. Players may hold more than one non-FIFA nationality.

Transfers

In

Out

Competitions

Overview

Torneo Apertura

League table

Results summary

Result round by round

Matches

Liguilla

Quarter-finals

Semi-finals

Apertura Copa MX

Group stage

Round of 16

Quarterfinals

Semifinal

Final

Torneo Clausura

League table

Results summary

Result round by round

Matches

Liguilla

Quarter-finals

Semi-finals

CONCACAF Champions League

Round of 16

Quarter-finals

Semifinals 
Kickoff times are in CST (UTC-06) unless shown otherwise

Finals

Statistics

Goals

Clean sheets

References

External links

Mexican football clubs 2018–19 season
C.F. Monterrey seasons
Monterrey
CONCACAF Champions League-winning seasons